Vosk may refer to:

 Jessica Vosk, American singer and actress
 Vosk, river in the fictional world of Gor
 Vosk (Star Trek), Star Trek character